"Falling in Love" is the first single by the American post-disco/R&B trio Surface, released in the United Kingdom and the United States in 1983 on Salsoul Records.

The song reached number 84 on the Billboard R&B chart in summer 1983.

"Falling in Love" was written, produced and arranged by David "Pic" Conley and Tony Byrd.

Track listing

UK & US 12" single
 "Falling in Love" – 6:25
 "Falling in Love (Instrumental)" – 7:30

Recording credits
 Karen Copeland - Lead Vocals
 David "Pic" Conley - Minimoog Bass & Flute
 David Townsend - Fender Rhodes & Guitar
 Kevin " Ignatz " Moore - Drums
 Gary Henry - Yamaha Grand & Prophet 5
 Produced by David Conley, Toni Byrd
 Written by David Conley, Toni Byrd
 Remixed by Shep Pettibone
 Produced and Arranged by David "Pic" Conley, Toni Byrd
 Recorded at House Of Music by Julian Robertson

Chart performance

References

External links
 "Falling in Love" (1983) on Discogs.com 
 "Falling in Love" in Discomusic.com

1983 debut singles
1983 songs
Surface (band) songs
Songs written by David Conley (musician)